WWTA (88.5 FM) was a high school radio station licensed to Marion, Massachusetts, United States. The station served the New Bedford-Fall River area.  The station was owned by Tabor Academy.  Its license expired April 1, 2014 after Tabor Academy did not renew it.

References

WTA
High school radio stations in the United States
Marion, Massachusetts
Tabor Academy (Massachusetts)
Mass media in Plymouth County, Massachusetts
Radio stations established in 1993
1993 establishments in Massachusetts
Radio stations disestablished in 2014
Defunct radio stations in the United States
2014 disestablishments in Massachusetts
WTA